The First Nations Junior B Lacrosse League (formerly Iroquois Nations Junior B Lacrosse League) is a box lacrosse league sanctioned by the First Nations Lacrosse Association. The league was formed in 2014 with the restructuring of the Canadian Lacrosse Association. Four teams competed in the inaugural season.

The league winner earns a spot in the Founders' Cup, the national championship of Junior B lacrosse in North America.

History
The first game in INJBLL history was contested between Tonawanda and Seneca on May 24, 2014 at Cattaraugus Community Center. Seneca won the game 27-4. Brandon Brooks (7 goals, 6 assists) was named Player of the Game.

The WarChiefs finished a perfect 12-0 regular season and went on to win the playoff title over Onondaga 3-1 (best-of 5 series). Seneca finished as Silver medalist at the 2014 Founders Cup, falling 14-7 to the Ontario Junior B Lacrosse League champion Six Nations Rebels.

In 2015 the league joined forces with the Montreal Junior Lacrosse League to for a 7-team league, renamed First Nations Junior B Lacrosse League. Teams play each other twice in the regular season for a 12-game schedule.

Fédération de crosse du Québec (FCQ) member teams Montreal Jr. Shamrocks and Vermont Jr. Voyageurs are not eligible to represent the FNLA at Founders Cup.

On May 16, 2015 the Montreal Jr. Shamrocks won the first-ever FNJBLL game, 6-5 over Kanehsatake Warriors. The game was played at Aréna Kevin-Lowe in Lachute, Québec.

After playing eight games in the 2015 season the Jr. Voyageurs withdrew from the league, citing player commitments.

Seneca repeated as league champion in 2015 winning the two-day playoff tournament on July 24-25 at Cattaraugus Community Center. The WarChiefs defeated Tonawanda Jr. Braves 29-3 in a semifinal before downing Onondaga Jr. Redhawks in the championship game.

Kanehsatake Jr. Warriors went on hiatus for the 2016 season leaving the league with four teams. Seneca WarChiefs dominated the competition finishing a perfect 10-0 regular season, outscoring opponents 210-59. The WarChiefs went on to sweep Onondaga in a two games (best-of 3 playoff) to win their third-consecutive league championship.

Teams

Former teams 
Kanehsatake Jr. Warriors (2015)

Montreal Jr. Shamrocks (2015)

Rochester J-Hawks (2014-16)

Tonawanda Jr. Braves (2014-17) - returned in 2022

Vermont Jr. Voyageurs (2015)

Champions

Founders' Cup

References

External links 
FNJBLL website
@FNJBLL Twitter
Onondaga Redhawks website
Rochester J-Hawks website
Seneca WarChiefs website
Tonawanda Braves website

Lacrosse leagues in Canada
Lacrosse leagues in the United States
Lacrosse of the Iroquois Confederacy
Sports leagues established in 2014